Agaporomorphus is a genus of beetles in the family Dytiscidae.

Species
The genus contains the following species:

 Agaporomorphus colberti Miller & Wheeler, 2008
Agaporomorphus dolichodactylus K.B.Miller, 2001
 Agaporomorphus grandisinuatus K.B.Miller, 2001
 Agaporomorphus knischi Zimmermann, 1921
 Agaporomorphus mecolobus K.B.Miller, 2001
 Agaporomorphus pereirai Guignot, 1957
 Agaporomorphus silvaticus K.B.Miller, 2005
 Agaporomorphus tambopatensis K.B.Miller, 2005

References

Dytiscidae

Dytiscidae genera